Hubicki is a surname. Notable people with the surname include:

 Alfred Ritter von Hubicki (1887–1971), Austro-Hungarian general
 Christian Hubicki, Survivor reality show participant
 Peggy Hubicki (1915–2006), English composer and music teacher